Father Raymond J. de Souza (born 17 June 1971) is a columnist for the National Post newspaper, the editor-in-chief of Convivium Magazine. He also writes columns for the National Catholic Register, the Catholic Herald, and the Catholic Register.

De Souza is the parish priest of Sacred Heart of Mary Parish on Wolfe Island, Ontario, Canada and the current chaplain at the Newman House Catholic Chaplaincy at Queen's University in Kingston, Ontario, and is also chaplain of the Queen's football team, the Golden Gaels. He teaches at Queen's in the Department of Economics and previously at the Duncan MacArthur Faculty of Education at Queen's University.

De Souza has completed a Master of Public Administration in public policy at Queen’s University, and a Masters of Philosophy in development economics at Cambridge. His theological training was at St. Philip's Seminary in Toronto and at the Pontifical North American College, and the Pontifical University of the Holy Cross in Rome. He has been a Senior Fellow of Massey College at the University of Toronto since 2016.

He was born in Sarnia, Ontario, Canada on 17 June 1971. His parents were born in Kenya and his grandparents were from the former Portuguese colony of Goa.

References

Canadian columnists
21st-century Canadian Roman Catholic priests
Living people
National Post people
Roman Catholic writers
Editors of religious publications
Academic staff of the Queen's University at Kingston
Queen's University at Kingston alumni
Massey College, Toronto
Alumni of the University of Cambridge
Pontifical North American College alumni
1971 births